Quarteto em Cy (a play on words of the Portuguese for Quartet in B by poet and lyricist Vinicius de Moraes) is a Brazilian girl group originally composed of four sisters hailing from Ibirataia, a town located in the Brazilian state of Bahia: Cybele, Cylene, Cynara and Cyva – their real first names.

History 

They started performing in 1959, appearing on local television in that year. Cyva, the leader of the group, then moved to Rio de Janeiro, and persuaded her three sisters to join her there. They then started to make regular appearances in the boates (small nightclubs) of Rio, particularly Bottle's bar and the legendary Zum-Zum, where they caught the attention of Vinicius de Moraes and other prominent figures of the bossa nova scene. Their first album was released in 1964, and was to be followed by regular releases up to the late '90s, at the frequency of one a year, and sometimes more. Connoisseurs of MPB and tropicalia have a particular regard for the first few years of their recording career, when they were signed to Brazil's most daring label, Elenco.

The Quarteto em Cy, noted for the extraordinary precision of the vocalists' intonation and delivery, performed and recorded with almost every single major Brazilian artist of the '60s and '70s; their popularity exceeded and still exceeds the borders of their native country. They met with great success in America in the mid-sixties, and have a considerable following in Japan, where they still tour regularly.

The line-up of the quartet (which briefly split up, from 1970 to 1972) has changed a great deal over the years. However, the current formation (Cyva, Cybele, Cynara and Sonya) has been active since 1980, by far the most stable period in the group's history

On 21 August 2014 Cybele died of a lung ischemia at her home in Rio de Janeiro. She was 74.

Discography

 1964: Quarteto em Cy
 1965: Vinícius/Caymmi no Zum Zum – with Quarteto em Cy and Oscar Castro Neves
 1965: Caymmi and The Girls From Bahia – Quarteto em Cy and Dorival Caymmi
 1966: Som Definitivo – Quarteto em Cy and Tamba Trio
 1966: Os Afro-Sambas – Quarteto em Cy, Vinicius de Moraes and Baden Powell
 1966: The Girls From Bahia/Pardon My English
 1966: Quarteto em Cy
 1967: De Marré de Cy
 1967: ¡Revolución con Brasilia!/The Girls From Bahia
 1968: Em Cy Maior
 1972: Quarteto em Cy
 1974: Saravá, Vinicius! Vinicius de Moraes en São Paulo Con Toquinho y Quarteto em Cy
 1975: Antologia do Samba Canção
 1976: Antologia do Samba Canção/volume 2
 1977: Resistindo Ao Vivo
 1978: Querelas do Brasil
 1978: Cobra de Vidro – Quarteto em Cy e MPB4
 1979: Quarteto em Cy Em 1000 Kilohertz
 1980: Flicts – Quarteto em Cy, MPB4 and Sérgio Ricardo
 1980: Quarteto em Cy interpreta Gonzaguinha, Caetano, Ivan, Milton
 1981: Caymmis, Lobos e Jobins/Caminhos Cruzados
 1983: Pontos de Luz
 1989: Claudio Santoro Prelúdios e Canções de Amor
 1990: Os Afro-Sambas – Quarteto em Cy, Vinicius de Moraes and Baden Powell
 1991: Chico em Cy
 1992: Bossa em Cy
 1993: Vinícius em Cy
 1994: Tempo e Artista
 1996: Brasil em Cy
 1997: Bate-Boca – Quarteto em Cy e MPB4
 1998: Somos Todos Iguais – Quarteto em Cy and MPB4, with Ivan Lins and Djavan
 1999: Gil e Caetano em Cy
 2000: Vinícius A Arte do Encontro – Quarteto em Cy and MPB4
 2001: Falando de Amor pra Vinícius Ao Vivo – Quarteto em Cy and Luiz Cláudio Ramos
 2001: Hora da Criança
 2002: Quarteto em Cy
 2004: Quarteto em Cy Quarenta Anos
 2006: Samba em Cy

Bibliography 

 Enciclopédia da música brasileira: erudita, folclórica e popular. São Paulo, Art Editora, 2000

References 

Brazilian musical groups
Musical groups established in 1959
Vocal quartets
1959 establishments in Brazil
Brazilian girl groups